Gateway Community College (GCC) is a public community college with its main campus in New Haven, Connecticut, and an automotive technology campus in North Haven. As of February 17, 2010, GCC had the highest credit enrollment among Connecticut's community colleges, with 7416 students enrolled in for-credit classes.   It was formed in 1992 by the merger of South Central Community College in New Haven and the Greater New Haven State Technical College in North Haven.

History
Gateway Community College was formed on July 1, 1992, from the consolidation of two
other secondary institutions.  The former South Central Community College (at Long Wharf) combined resources with the former Greater New Haven State Technical College in North Haven.

References

External links
 Official website

Education in New Haven, Connecticut
Community colleges in Connecticut
Educational institutions established in 1992
Universities and colleges in New Haven County, Connecticut
1992 establishments in Connecticut